Carnation is the second album from the singer songwriter Astrid Williamson released on her own label, Incarnation Records, in 2002. It was reissued under the title Astrid Williamson in 2003, adding 4 acoustic demos to the track listing. In comparison to her debut, Boy For You, it was "a decidedly more stripped down affair, based mostly on acoustic guitar or piano". Both producer Robert White & musician Terry Bickers were members of the psyche rock band, Levitation plus Robert's Milk & Honey Band recruited Astrid to play with them for live dates in the 2000s

Track listing 
 Never Enough
 Love 
 To Love You
 Bye & Bye
 Blood Horizon
 Calling 
 Girlfriend
 Tumbling Into Blue
 Lucky
 Call For Beauty
Only on 2003 'Astrid' reissue 
 Superman
 This Is How It's Done Here
 Blood Horizon
 Close My Eyes

Personnel and recording details 
 Produced and mixed by Astrid Williamson and Robert White
 Astrid Williamson – vocals, E-bow, piano, synthesizer, electric guitar
 Satin Singh – percussion
 Terry Bickers – electric guitar, harmonica
 Mik Tubb – 12 string electric guitar
 Robert White – bass guitar, electric organ, mandolin, arrangements, tambourine. electric guitar

References 

2002 albums
Astrid Williamson albums